Golbaf (also Romanized as Golbāf; also known as Gowk) is a city and capital of Golbaf District, in Kerman County, Kerman Province, Iran.  At the 2006 census, its population was 8,341, in 2,039 families.

References

Populated places in Kerman County

Cities in Kerman Province